Carl August Henry Ericsson, born 6 February 1898 in St. Michel, Finland, died 16 October 1933 in Borgå, was a Finnish graphic artist and decorative painter.

Henry Ericsson was the son of Lieutenant Alexander Ericsson and Carolina Albertina Valeriana Aspling. He graduated from the Central Academy of Fine Arts 1915–1918 and 1919, at the Accademia di Belle Arti di Roma in Rome and at Académie Colarossi and Académie de la Grande Chaumiere in Paris 1922–1924.

Gallery

References

Bibliography
 Christoffer H. Ericsson: Min far – en konstnärsbiografi, Litorale, Borgå 2002,

External links

  Artwork in the Finnish National Gallery

Finnish graphic designers
20th-century Finnish painters
1898 births
1933 deaths
People from Porvoo
Alumni of the Académie de la Grande Chaumière
Finnish male painters
20th-century Finnish male artists